Jessica Moore (born Luciana Ottaviani on August 8, 1967) is a retired Italian actress who was active from 1986 to 1989, appearing mainly in erotic drama and horror films. She is best known for her role as the writer and libertine Sarah Asproon in the commercially successful films Eleven Days, Eleven Nights (1987) and Top Model (1988), both produced and directed by Joe D'Amato. In Italian productions, she is sometimes credited as Gilda Germano.

Early life 
Jessica Moore was born on August 8, 1967 as Luciana Ottaviani in Urbino. She moved to Pesaro.

Career 
From 1986 to 1989, she appeared in about 10 films.

She entered film by chance, introduced by Pamela Prati and her model agency to Joe D'Amato, for whom she debuted in Convent of Sinners (1986) under her birthname, acting in a supporting role as Sister Ursula. She became known for her second collaboration with D'Amato, the erotic drama Eleven Days, Eleven Nights (1987), in which she acted as the protagonist Sarah Asproon, a writer and libertine. The film turned its model, Adrian Lyne's 9-1/2 Weeks, on its head by swapping the gender roles and was successful internationally. The following year, Moore returned as Sarah Asproon in the sequel Top model. Moore remembers that she was jestingly dubbed "la campagnola" ("the country girl") on set since she was ashamed and hesitant before becoming jaunty in the end. She also remembers trusting D'Amato and feeling very much at her ease but also that he made certain "jokes" and "editing tricks" and a number of shots that she did not like.

From the end of 1987 to the beginning of 1988, she appeared on TV as one of the dancing "ragazze coccodé" ("cluck cluck girls") for Renzo Arbore in Indietro tutta! and in 1989 in the second episode of the TV series Classe di ferro. She continued acting in supporting roles in theatrically released horror and other genre films until 1989. Moore subsequently retired from the film business. According to D'Amato, her partner did not want her to take erotic roles.

As a model she appeared in Playboy, Playmen and Gin Fizz / Gin Film.

For the Italian DVD release of Eleven Days, Eleven Nights by CG Home Video in 2010, a documentary titled Ultimo Tango a New Orleans was made by Manlio Gomarasca e Davide Pulici in which Moore recounts her experiences on shooting with D'Amato in America.

Filmography

Cinema 
Convent of Sinners (1986)
Eleven Days, Eleven Nights (1987)
Top model (1988)
Riflessi di luce (1988)
Non aver paura della zia Marta (1988)
Sodoma's Ghost (1988)
Escape from death (1989)
Violence selz (1989)
A Cat in the Brain (1989) (only archive footage)

Television 
Il Veneziano - Vita e amori di Giacomo Casanova (1986) – TV film (credited as Gilda Germano)
Indietro tutta! (1987/1988)
Cheeeese (1988) – TV film 
Classe di ferro (1989) - TV series (credited as Gilda Germano)

References

External links

Bibliography 

 

Video source:
 

1967 births
Living people
20th-century Italian actresses
Italian film actresses
Italian television actresses